The Indi One is a battery electric compact crossover SUV manufactured by Indi EV.

Overview 

The Indi One was presented for the first time in mid-October 2021 as a result of a 4-year construction process initiated by the creation of the Indi startup in 2017 in Los Angeles, California.

The stylist Andre Hudson was responsible for the stylistic design of the car, giving the One its characteristic, futuristic proportions in the style of the so-called Coupe SUVs with a gently sloping roofline and wide LED lighting panels covering the entire width of the body. The two-tone exterior paintwork is matched to large 22-inch alloy wheels. According to the manufacturer's declaration, the crossover was technically equipped with the so-called supercomputer supporting, among others software controlling the propulsion system.

Indi started collecting orders for its first car in the first months of 2022,  of which the first copies are to be delivered not earlier than in 2023. The prices at which the range of variants of the One are to be available are expected to be between $45,000 and $65,000. In October 2022, the Taiwanese company Foxconn announced that the production of the One will take place at the Lordstown Assembly at Lordstown, Ohio.

Specifications
The One is a fully electric four-wheel drive vehicle. The vehicle is equipped with a fast charging function.

References 

Upcoming car models
Compact sport utility vehicles
Crossover sport utility vehicles
Production electric cars
All-wheel-drive vehicles
Electric concept cars
First car made by manufacturer